VTCC may refer to:
 Chiang Mai International Airport (ICAO airport code)
 Virginia Tech Corps of Cadets, the military component of the student body at Virginia Polytechnic Institute and State University